Thomas Jack Stagg (born 9 September 2002) is an English professional footballer who plays as a centre forward for Isthmian League Premier Division club Cray Wanderers.

Stagg joined the Colchester United Academy at under-8 level from Kelvedon Hatch. His scholarship with Colchester started in 2019 where he would make his professional debut in 2021. He has had loan spells at Maldon & Tiptree, Witham Town, East Thurrock Utd, Billericay Town and Hashtag Utd.

Career 
Born in Harlow, centre forward Stagg signed for the Colchester United Academy at under-8 level, joining from local side Kelvedon Hatch. He was sent out on loan to Maldon & Tiptree in both the 2019–20 and 2020–21 seasons, and at Witham Town splitting the two stints with the Jammers. He then went on a month loan to East Thurrock, where he played 5 games. After this he was sent out on another month loan, this time to National League South side Billericay Town. Close to the end of the 2021–22 season, Stagg was sent out on loan to Hashtag United, where he featured three times in the league, scoring an 88th-minute equaliser after coming off the bench on his debut against Great Wakering Rovers.

Stagg made his professional debut for Colchester in League Two on 8 May 2021. He was named on the first team substitutes bench for the first time in his career. He was then brought on for Frank Nouble in the 84th-minute of Colchester's 0–0 draw with Tranmere Rovers in the final game of the 2020–21 season.

Stagg was released by Colchester United at the end of the 2021-22 season.

On 1 May 2022 he went on trial with Sunderland, and featured in their Premier League 2 Division 2 game against Southampton, where he was subbed off after 67 minutes, and nothing further seems to have come from it. 

In October 2022, the signing of Stagg was confirmed by Isthmian League Premier Division club Cray Wanderers. He had made his debut for the club a few days prior on 27 September, in a Kent Senior Cup game against Sheppey United.

Career statistics

References

External links

2002 births
Living people
Sportspeople from Harlow
English footballers
Association football forwards
Colchester United F.C. players
Maldon & Tiptree F.C. players
Witham Town F.C. players
East Thurrock United F.C. players
Billericay Town F.C. players
Hashtag United F.C. players
Cray Wanderers F.C. players
Isthmian League players
English Football League players
National League (English football) players